In the mathematical field of spectral graph theory, a Ramanujan graph is a regular graph whose spectral gap is almost as large as possible (see extremal graph theory). Such graphs are excellent spectral expanders. As Murty's survey paper notes, Ramanujan graphs "fuse diverse branches of pure mathematics, namely, number theory, representation theory, and algebraic geometry". 
These graphs are indirectly named after Srinivasa Ramanujan; their name comes from the Ramanujan–Petersson conjecture, which was used in a construction of some of these graphs.

Definition

Because  is connected and -regular, its eigenvalues satisfy  .

Define . A connected -regular graph  is a Ramanujan graph if .

Many sources uses an alternative definition  (whenever there exists  with ) to define Ramanujan graphs. In other words, we allow  in addition to the "small" eigenvalues. Since  if and only if the graph is bipartite, we will refer to the graphs that satisfy this alternative definition but not the first definition bipartite Ramanujan graphs. If  is a Ramanujan graph, then  is a bipartite Ramanujan graph, so the existence of Ramanujan graphs is stronger.

As observed by Toshikazu Sunada, a regular graph is Ramanujan if and only if its Ihara zeta function satisfies an analog of the Riemann hypothesis.

Examples and constructions

Explicit examples 

 The complete graph  has spectrum , and thus  and the graph is a Ramanujan graph for every . The complete bipartite graph  has spectrum  and hence is a bipartite Ramanujan graph for every .
 The Petersen graph has spectrum , so it is a 3-regular Ramanujan graph. The icosahedral graph is a 5-regular Ramanujan graph.
 A Paley graph of order  is -regular with all other eigenvalues being , making Paley graphs an infinite family of Ramanujan graphs.

Mathematicians are often interested in constructing infinite families of -regular Ramanujan graphs for every fixed . Such families are useful in applications.

Algebraic constructions 
Several explicit constructions of Ramanujan graphs arise as Cayley graphs and are algebraic in nature. See Winnie Li's survey on Ramanujan's conjecture and other aspects of number theory relevant to these results.

Both proofs use the Ramanujan conjecture, which led to the name of Ramanujan graphs. Besides being Ramanujan graphs, these constructions satisfies some other properties, for example, their girth is  where  is the number of nodes.

Let us sketch the Lubotzky-Phillips-Sarnak construction. It is proved that  is a Ramanujan graph.

Morgenstern later extended the construction of Lubotzky, Phillips and Sarnak. His extended construction holds whenever  is a prime power.

Arnold Pizer proved that the supersingular isogeny graphs are Ramanujan, although they tend to have lower girth than the graphs of Lubotzky, Phillips, and Sarnak. Like the graphs of Lubotzky, Phillips, and Sarnak, the degrees of these graphs are always a prime number plus one.

Probabilistic examples 
Adam Marcus, Daniel Spielman and Nikhil Srivastava proved the existence of infinitely many -regular bipartite Ramanujan graphs for any . Later they proved that there exist bipartite Ramanujan graphs of every degree and every number of vertices. Michael B. Cohen showed how to construct these graphs in polynomial time.

The initial work followed an approach of Bilu and Linial. They considered an operation called a 2-lift that takes a -regular graph  with  vertices and a sign on each edge, and produces a new -regular graph  on  vertices. Bilu & Linial conjectured that there always exists a signing so that every new eigenvalue of  has magnitude at most . This conjecture guarantees the existence of Ramanujan graphs with degree  and  vertices for any —simply start with the complete graph , and iteratively take 2-lifts that retain the Ramanujan property.

Using the method of interlacing polynomials, Marcus, Spielman, and Srivastava proved Bilu & Linial's conjecture holds when  is already a bipartite Ramanujan graph, which is enough to conclude the existence result. The sequel proved the stronger statement that a sum of  random bipartite matchings is Ramanujan with non-vanishing probability.

It is still an open problem whether there are infinitely many -regular (non-bipartite) Ramanujan graphs for any .

Ramanujan graphs as expander graphs 
The constant  in the definition of Ramanujan graphs is asymptotically sharp. This means that Ramanujan graphs are essentially the best possible expander graphs.

Therefore, the diameter of Ramanujan graphs are also bounded logarithmically in terms of the number of vertices.

Random graphs 
Confirming a conjecture of Alon, Friedman showed that many families of random graphs are weakly-Ramanujan. While this result shows that random graphs are close to being Ramanujan, it cannot be used to prove the existence of Ramanujan graphs. It is conjectured, though, that random graphs are Ramanujan with substantial probability (roughly 52%). In addition to direct numerical evidence, there is some theoretical support for this conjecture: the spectral gap of a -regular graph seems to behave according to a  Tracy-Widom distribution from random matrix theory, which would predict the same asymptotic.

Applications of Ramanujan graphs 
Expander graphs have many applications to computer science, number theory, and group theory, see e.g Lubotzky's survey on applications to pure and applied math and Hoory, Linial, and Wigderson's survey which focuses on computer science.. Ramanujan graphs are in some sense the best expanders, and so they are especially useful in applications where expanders are needed. Importantly, the Lubotzky, Phillips, and Sarnak graphs can be traversed extremely quickly in practice, so they are practical for applications.

Some example applications include

 In an application to fast solvers for Laplacian linear systems, Lee, Peng, and Spielman relied on the existence of bipartite Ramanujan graphs of every degree in order to quickly approximate the complete graph. 
Lubetzky and Peres proved that the simple random walk exhibits cutoff phenomenon on all Ramanujan graphs. This means that the random walk undergoes a phase transition from being completely unmixed to completely mixed in the total variation norm. This result strongly relies on the graph being Ramanujan, not just an expander—some good expanders are known to not exhibit cutoff. 
 Ramanujan graphs of Pizer have been proposed as the basis for post-quantum elliptic-curve cryptography.
 Ramanujan graphs can be used to construct expander codes, which are good error correcting codes.

See also 

 Expander graph
Alon-Boppana bound
 Expander mixing lemma
 Spectral graph theory

References

Further reading

External links
 Survey paper by M. Ram Murty
Survey paper by Alexander Lubotzky
Survey paper by Hoory, Linial, and Wigderson

Graph families
Algebraic graph theory
Spectral theory
Regular graphs
Srinivasa Ramanujan